Latho is a traditional solitaire game played by the Dorzé people of Ethiopia. The equipment needed to play the game is similar to that used for mancala games, i.e., a board with 2 rows of 6 "pits", and 30 counters ("seeds"). The game was first described by British academic Richard Pankhurst in 1971.

Rules
At game setup, the 30 seeds are placed in the 2x6 pits according to the following scheme:

2 3 1 3 2 4
2 3 1 3 2 4

Although the game is technically a solitaire, it requires a second person besides the player, who has the function of a "dealer". The dealer and player must first agree about the pit of the board from which to start. The player then closes his eyes (or is blindfolded) and must declare out loud the number of seeds in each of the pits of the board, counterclockwise from the starting pit. The traditional declarations used in Ethiopia are: 

 oydo éka ("take from four")
 héza éka ("take from three")
 namo éka ("take from two")
 isimo éka ("take from one")
 afo éka ("don't take")

As long as the declaration is correct (i.e., the pit has that exact number of seeds), the dealer will remove one seed from the pit. The game will thus continue until the board is empty (in which case the player has succeeded) or the player fails to declare the correct number of seeds.

See also
There are several other solitaires based on mancala boards, for example:
 El Arnab (Sudan)
 Tagega (Konso people, Ethiopia)

Footnotes

References
 J. U. Egharevba (1949). Benin Games.
 H. J. R. Murray (1951). A History of Board-Games other than Chess. Oxford University Press, Oxford, p. 180.
 Richard Pankhurst (1971). Gabata and Related Board Games of Ethiopia and the Horn of Africa. In Ethiopia Observer 14 (3), pp. 154–206.

Traditional mancala games
Ethiopian culture